Lamazière-Haute is a commune in the Corrèze department in central France.

Population

Sights
Arboretum du Massif des Agriers

See also
Communes of the Corrèze department

References

Communes of Corrèze